Englishman River is a river in the eastern side of Vancouver Island, British Columbia, Canada. It is an important watershed providing habitat for various species of salmon and community water to the residents of Parksville and surrounding area. The Englishman River watershed includes Arrowsmith Lake, Hidden Lake, Fishtail Lake, Rowbotham Lake, Healy Lake, Shelton Lake, and Rhododendron Lake.

It is famed for its two picturesque waterfalls and treed campsites. The park was created on December 20, 1940, in an effort to protect the old-growth forest and its associated ecosystem along the river in the vicinity of the waterfalls.

A dammed reservoir on the Englishman is a source of water for Parksville, British Columbia.

It has been called Englishman River since at least 1883 to commemorate an unknown Englishman who drowned trying to cross.

South Englishman River 
The Englishman's south fork begins at Shelton (Echo) Lake and shortly after exiting the north end of that lake enters Healy (Panther) Lake. The river then exits the far end of the lake and flows northeast to where it merges with the main fork of the Englishman.

History 

According to a local legend, indigenous people in the area found the skeleton of a Caucasian man near the waterfalls, thus giving the river its current name; the river was given its name because "an Englishman was drowned while attempting to cross." Spanish mapmakers originally named it the "Rio de Grullas," presumably because of the large number of great blue herons living at its estuary (grulla being Spanish for "crane").

References

Rivers of Vancouver Island
Mid Vancouver Island